The Tripolitania Punic inscriptions are a number of Punic language inscriptions found in the region of Tripolitania – specifically its three classical cities of Leptis Magna, Sabratha and Oea (Tripoli), with the vast majority being found in Leptis Magna. The inscriptions have been found in various periods over the last two centuries, and were catalogued by Giorgio Levi Della Vida. A subset of the inscriptions feature in all the major corpuses of Canaanite and Aramaic inscriptions, notably as KAI 119-132.

In addition to inscriptions in the Punic script, the corpus includes a number of Punic inscriptions written in Latin script, such as KAI 304-305.

According to Karel Jongeling, 68 inscriptions are known from Lepcis Magna, 15 from Sabratha, 10 from Oea, 4 from Zaiuet el-Mahgiub, 3 from Wadi el-Amud, 2 from Germa and 1 each from El-Amruni, Gasr Doga, Bir Gebira, Bu Khemmàsc, Henchir Gen Rieime, Misurata Marina, Al-Qusbat, Ras el-Hadagia, Sàmet el-Crèma, Taglit and Tarhuna.

Early discoveries
Prior to 1927, only eight Punic inscriptions from all of Tripolitania had been published.

The first find was in 1806 by Jacques-Denis Delaporte at Leptis Magna, published in his 1836 memoir:
I turned south and climbed the remains of the temple of Friendship. I had barely reached the mound when I set foot upon a hard stone. The foreign characters under the Latin characters engraved on it made this monument so precious in my eyes, that I have not hesitated to include a copy of the inscription... It is a shame that it is only a fragment, because it could allow clarification of Punic or Phoenician writing, which is, I believe, that of this inscription, because lingua punica quidquid terraram est à Cyrene usque ad Gades occupavit... The stone is still on the spot: I have not urged the Americans to seize it, because it suits France better, if it is deemed worthy of adorning the Napoleon Museum.

Delaporte identified the language as Punic by reference to a quote from Samuel Bochart's 1646 work Canaan, which translates in full as: "...the language of Canaan, whether Phoenician or Punic, which was brought from Phoenicia into Africa, and occupied all the world from Cyrene to Gades."

By 1857, five inscriptions were known.

Later discoveries
For forty years between 1927-1967, Giorgio Levi Della Vida worked to prepare a corpus of the Punic inscriptions in Tripolitania, intended as the Punic parallel of Joyce Reynolds' and John Bryan Ward-Perkins'  The Inscriptions of Roman Tripolitania (IRT). Levi Della Vida's corpus brought together research which has often appeared in periodicals that are not very accessible, sometimes defunct, and were not always accompanied by adequate photographic documentation.

Concordance

Other
 KAI 178 Leptis Magna Latino-Libyan [in LATIN]

Bibliography
 Levi Della Vida, 1927: Giorgio Levi Della Vida Le iscrizioni neopuniche della tripolitania, Libya (Rivista didella Tripolitania) 1 (III) 1927 91-116
 Levi Della Vida, 1935: Giorgio Levi Della Vida Due iscrizioni neopuniche di Leptis Magna, Africa Italiana 6 1935 3-15; 107-115
 Levi Della Vida, 1938: Giorgio Levi Della Vida Il Teatro Augusteo di Leptis Magna secondo le ultime scoperte e un'iscrizione bilingue in latino e neo-punico II, Africa Italiana 6, 3-4 1935 (published 1938) 104-109
 Levi Della Vida, 1942: Giorgio Levi Della Vida The Phoenician God Satrapes, Bulletin of the American Schools of Oriental Research 87 1942 29-32
 Levi Della Vida, 1949: Giorgio Levi Della Vida Iscrizioni neopuniche di Tripolitania, Rendiconti di Accademia Nazionale dei Lincei 8 1949 399-412
 Levi Della Vida, 1967: Giorgio Levi Della Vida Su una bilingue latino-punica da Leptis Magna, Atti dell'Accademia delle Scienze di Torino 101 1967 395-409
 Levi Della Vida, 1987: Giorgio Levi Della Vida and Amadasi Guzzo, Iscrizione Puniche della Tripolitania, 1987

References

External links
 Neo-punic inscriptions from Libya

Archaeological artifacts
KAI inscriptions
Punic inscriptions
Tripolitania